Speak is an album by the folk trio the Roches, released in 1989 on MCA Records. The album contained two singles that had accompanying videos, "Big Nuthin'" and "Everyone Is Good". Another track, "Nocturne", was included in the 1988 film Crossing Delancey. (The trio had contributed several songs to the movie's soundtrack, and the film costarred Suzzy Roche as the best friend of Amy Irving's character.)

"Big Nuthin'" was a minor radio hit.

Track listing

 "Speak"
 "Big Nuthin'"
 "Cloud Dancing"
 "Everyone Is Good"
 "In the World"
 "I Love My Mom"
 "Losing Our Job"
 "Person With a Past"
 "The Anti-Sex Backlash of the 80's"
 "Easy"
 "Nocturne"
 "Merciful God"
 "Broken Places"
 "Feeling Is Mutual"

Personnel

 Produced By The Roches And Jeffrey Lesser
 Engineered by Jeffrey Lesser
 Executive Producer: Teddy Wainwright
 A&R: Marty Scott
 Jeff Lippay: Assistant Engineer / Glen Zdon: Live Sound / Mastering: Grag Calbi, Sterling Sound, Inc.
 Recorded and Mixed at RPM Studios, New York, NY.
 Art Director: Toni Scott / Layout: Murray Brenman
 Photography: Timothy White / Hand Lettering: Stephen Foster / Illustrations: Terre Roche

Musicians 
 Maggie Roche: Singing, piano, synthesizers, keyboard bass
 Terre Roche: Singing, guitars
 Suzzy Roche: Singing, synthesizers, guitars
 Carter Cathcart: Piano on "Losing Our Job", synthesizer strings and horn.
 Libby McLaren: Synthesizers, keyboard bass
 Vince Cherico: Drums, drum programming, percussion
 Fernando Saunders: Bass Guitar
 The Roches: Drum and synthesizer programming
 Larry Fast: Additional synthesizer programming

References

1989 albums
The Roches albums
MCA Records albums